The Qin Empire III is a 2017 Chinese television series based on Sun Haohui's novel of the same Chinese title, which romanticizes the events in China during the Warring States period primarily from the perspective of the Qin state under King Zhaoxiang. It was first aired on CCTV-1 in mainland China in 2017. It was preceded by The Qin Empire (2009) and The Qin Empire II: Alliance (2012) and followed by The Qin Empire IV (2019), which were also based on Sun Haohui's novels.

Plot
The series is set in the late fourth century BC to the mid-third century BC during the Warring States period of China. In 305 BC, a young Ying Ji (King Zhaoxiang) becomes the ruler of the Qin state in western China after the sudden death of his brother, Ying Dang (King Wu). As he is still underage then, his mother Queen Dowager Xuan and maternal uncle Wei Ran rule on his behalf as regents until he comes to of age.

With the aid of the minister Fan Ju and general Bai Qi, King Zhaoxiang starts making aggressive advances against the other six states in the east. Under his rule, the Qin state destroys the Yiqu state, builds a section of the Great Wall, defeats the Qi and Chu states in battle, forces the Wei and Han states into submission, and inflicts a devastating defeat on the Zhao state at the Battle of Changping. After demonstrating its military power through its victories, in 256 BC the Qin state finally puts an end to the Eastern Zhou dynasty, the nominal suzerain power over the warring states. These events paved the way for the Qin state's eventual unification of China under the Qin dynasty within the next half-century.

Cast
 Main cast

 Ning Jing as Queen Dowager Xuan of Qin
 Zhang Bo as Ying Ji (King Zhaoxiang of Qin)
 Xing Jiadong as Bai Qi
 Lu Ning as Queen Yeyang of Qin
 Zhao Chunyang as Wei Ran
 Shen Jiani as Zhao Man
 Wu Liansheng as Fan Ju
 Wang Huichun as King Min of Qi
 Wang Shuangbao as Lian Po
 Chen Hao as King of Yiqu
 Peng Bo as King Huai of Chu
 Yang Zhigang as Mi Yuan
 Zheng Tianyong as Zhao Yang
 Wang Xiaoyi as Su Qin
 Huo Qing as Lord Mengchang of Qi

Other cast

 Fu Dalong as King Huiwen of Qin
 Fu Miao as Queen Huiwen of Qin
 Wang Zitong as Wei Lingyou
 Ma Xiaoning as Wei Youzhan
 Yuan Yu as Tang Bazi
 Zhou Bo as Ying Ji (Chuli Ji)
 Sun Qiang as Gan Mao
 Ying Qiang as Mi Rong
 Ji Yongqing as Sima Cuo
 Jin Shengyu as Meng Ao
 Yin Jing as Wang Ji
 Sui Tangyang as Wang He
 Wu Yuze as Wei Choufu
 Peng Guobin as Ying Shi
 Zhang Jingwei as Ying Kui
 Lu Jia as Zheng Anping
 Shen Baoping as Li Bing
 He Shubiao as Li Erlang
 Hu Jiaxu as Ying Zhuo
 Qiu Donghong as Hushang
 Sun Rong as King Zhaoxiang of Yan
 Wang Di as Jihu
 Dang Hao as Yue Yi
 Chen Liang as Jiming
 Ma Sai as Goudao
 Li Zonghan as Tian Jian
 Gao Jin as Lord Xinling of Wei
 Wu Hongwu as King Zhao of Wei
 Liu Zhongyuan as Wei Yu (King Anxi of Wei)
 Di Jianqing as Wei Qi
 Yao Runhao as Xu Gu
 Yan Yichang as Hou Ying
 Jiao Junxiang as Lin Xiangru
 Li Huailong as King Huiwen of Zhao
 Zhang Di as Zhao Dan (King Xiaocheng of Zhao)
 Liu Naiyi as Lord Pingyuan of Zhao
 Song Chongdong as Lord Pingyang of Zhao
 Zhou Le as Lord Fengyang of Zhao
 Qi Tao as Zhao She
 Zhang Yiwen as Zhao Kuo
 Gao Ying as Zhao Kuo's mother
 Ma Xiaoning as Lou Huan
 Liu Jun as Yu Qing
 Luo Tianyou as Mao Sui
 Chen Zhou as King Xi of Han
 Ren Xuehai as Gongzhong Chi
 Yang Tieran as Feng Ting
 Liao Wei as Xiong Heng (King Qingxiang of Chu)
 Lu Siyu as Xiong Wan (King Kaolie of Chu)
 Wei Hua as Zilan
 Xiahou Bin as Jin Shang
 Xu Dongsheng as Lord Chunshen of Chu
 Jin Song as Nao Chi
 Chen Xiao as Mi Yan

Broadcasts

Rating 

| 1-2 || ||0.944||2.643||2|| || || || align="left" | 
|-
| 3-4 || ||0.911||2.545||3|| || || || align="left" | 
|-
| 5-6 || ||0.933||2.703||2|| || || || align="left" | 
|-
| 7-8 || ||0.905||2.719||3|| || || || align="left" | 
|-
| 9-10 || ||0.872||2.527||5|| || || || align="left" | 
|-
| 11-12 || ||0.948||2.78||3|| || || || align="left" | 
|-
| 13-15 || ||0.794||2.846||5|| || || || align="left" | 
|-
| 16-18 || ||0.723||2.578||5|| || || || align="left" | 
|-
| 19-21 || ||0.732||2.649||3|| || || || align="left" | 
|-
| 22-24 || ||0.778||2.842||2|| || || || align="left" | 
|-
| 25-26 || ||0.914||2.786||2|| || || || align="left" | 
|-
| 27-28 || ||0.912||2.787||2|| || || || align="left" | 
|-
| 29-30 || ||0.875||2.615||3|| || || || align="left" | 
|-
| 31-32 || ||1.043||3.147||2|| || || || align="left" | 
|-
| 33-34 || ||0.85||2.635||2|| || || || align="left" | 
|-
!colspan="2"|Average viewing||0.862||2.719|||| || ||||align="left" |

External links
  The Qin Empire III official page on CCTV's website

2017 Chinese television series debuts
2017 Chinese television series endings
Television series set in the Zhou dynasty
Television shows based on Chinese novels
Chinese historical television series
The Qin Empire (TV series)
Television series set in the 4th century BC
Television series set in the 3rd century BC